Knightwatch is an American drama television series that aired on ABC from November 10, 1988 until January 19, 1989 as part of its fall 1988 lineup. It had been promoted as an original series in light of summer reruns continuing into the fall due to the 1988 Writers Guild of America Strike.

Summary
Knightwatch centers around the activities of the "Knights of the City", a volunteer group set up to assist law enforcement.  It was largely made up of ex-gang members (and was modeled after a similar real-life group, the Guardian Angels); the program focused on its charismatic leader, Tony Maldonado (Benjamin Bratt).  Operating out of donated space in the basement of a church, the group practiced martial arts and other unarmed techniques since they were not commissioned police officers and did not use firearms. Keeping young people with violent pasts from reverting to this pattern in their new-found calling was a constant challenge to Tony, as were the interpersonal relationships constantly developing among his young colleagues.

Knightwatch was a Nielsen ratings failure. It struggled in its timeslot, airing against NBC's The Cosby Show and A Different World and CBS's 48 Hours. It was cancelled after 3 months on the air.

Cast
 Benjamin Bratt as Tony Maldonado
 Don Franklin as Calvin Garvey
 Paris Vaughan as Leslie Chambers
 Joshua Cadman as Jason Snyder
 Ava Haddad as Casey Mitchell
 Calvin Levels as Mark 'Burn' Johnson
 Samantha Mathis as Jacquline 'Jake' Monroe
 Harley Jane Kozak as Barbara 'Babs' Shepard

Episodes

References

Sources
 Brooks, Tim and Marsh, Earle, The Complete Directory to Prime Time Network and Cable TV Shows

External links

American Broadcasting Company original programming
1980s American crime drama television series
1988 American television series debuts
1989 American television series endings
Television series by MGM Television
English-language television shows
Television shows set in New Jersey